Heukchi Sangji (黑齒常之, 630 – 689), courtesy name Hangwon(恒元), was a Korean-born Chinese military general of Baekje, one of the Three Kingdoms of Korea. He is remembered primarily as a leader of the Baekje Revival Movement to restore the kingdom after the capital fell in 660 to the Silla–Tang alliance. Later after their defeat he became a general of the Tang dynasty. In China he was known as "Heichi Changzhi".

Background
In 1929 the tomb of Heukchi Sangji was discovered and excavated in Luoyang, China. According to the Samguk Sagi, he was a man of the West Be (Bu, District) in Baekje who had surrendered to the army of the Tang dynasty at the fall of Baekje in 660, and became a distinguished Tang general. The epitaph states that his clan was a collateral branch of the Baekje royal family (Buyeo clan, 扶餘氏) but since their ancestors were enfeoffed with the Heuk-chi country (黑齒國), their descendants took this name. The epitaph also states that the Heukchi clan leaders held the rank of Dalsol (達率, 2nd court rank). According to the epitaph his great-grandfather was named Mundae (文大), his grandfather Deokhyeon (德顯), and his father was Sacha (沙次).

Baekje Revival Movement
In 660 a coalition of about 180,000 men of the Silla–Tang alliance led by Tang's Su Dingfang and Silla's Kim Yu-sin attacked Baekje and took the capital of Sabi. Sangji fled with several other generals to the Gangsan Fortress and joined the Baekje Revival Movement. He and his followers gathered 30,000 men in 10 days. Tang's Su Dingfang seemed to be eager to defeat him and Baekje people. But he won continuously reoccupying 200 or more castles.

In 663, Silla and Tang counterattacked, and besieged the restoration movement at a fortress known as Juryu Castle (주류성/周留城).At this point Boksin appears to have betrayed the restoration movement. He had Dochim killed and sought to slay Prince Pung as well. However, Pung killed him first, and fled to Goguryeo. The restoration movement was destroyed shortly thereafter at the Battle of Baekgang. During this battle his follower Yong Sak betrayed him for the Tang but Heukchi Sangji kept marching onward defeating several Chinese armies. He surrendered and the Tang appointed him as the Outer General of the Lieutenant's Army and the Yangju Citizen of the Lieutenant's Army.

General of Tang
Heukchi Sangji sallied forth for Tang's war against Göktürks.

Death
But Heukichi and his patron General Zhao felt out of favour from Wu Zetian and the two was sentenced to prison when they were slandered against. Finally, he came to be in chains and sentenced to death in 689.

In popular culture
From 1939 to 1940, Korean writer Hyun Jin-geon wrote a historic novel called  Heukchi Sangji,which was a novel created to elevate national sentiments against the Japanese colonial times.

See also
List of monarchs of Korea
Great Eight Families

Notes

630 births
689 deaths
Baekje people
Korean emigrants to China
Korean generals
Tang dynasty generals at war against Baekje
Tang dynasty generals at war against Tibet